Het Groot Paradijs is a defunct restaurant in Middelburg, in the Netherlands. It was a fine dining restaurant that was awarded one Michelin star in 1996 and retained that rating until 2002. For 2007, it was again awarded a Michelin star.

Owner and head chef of Het Groot Paradijs was Ferdie Dolk.

In the first star period, 1996–2002, Ron Henderikse was head chef.

The restaurant closed down in 2007, with the owners opening a new restaurant in Domburg.

The restaurant is housed in a Rijksmonument.

See also
List of Michelin starred restaurants in the Netherlands

References 

Restaurants in the Netherlands
Michelin Guide starred restaurants in the Netherlands
Defunct restaurants in the Netherlands
Het Groot Paradijs
Het Groot Paradijs